Dog and Beth: On the Hunt is an American reality television series and spin-off of Dog the Bounty Hunter that aired on CMT and debuted on April 21, 2013. It was announced on May 21, 2013, that CMT had ordered additional episodes of the first season. New episodes returned on August 24, 2013. Season 2 premiered on June 14, 2014 and ended in October 2014. Season 3 premiered on July 18, 2015 and ended in August 2015.

Beth Chapman announced on January 12, 2016 that the Chapmans were leaving CMT (with all rights to the show and other shows featuring the team), effectively cancelling the show.

A third spin-off, Dog's Most Wanted, on WGN America premiered in September 2019.

Premise
Each week, the Chapmans, their son Leland, and Leland's son Dakota fly from their Da Kine Bail Bonds headquarters in Hawaii to various bail bondsmen businesses around the United States as they assist in apprehending criminals. The series also encompass the group as they improve the bail bondsmen businesses techniques on how to run more efficiently, from the writing of bonds to the tedious task of tracking criminals and technological device training.

In the season three finale, Dakota quit the business after a falling out with his father and Leland announced he has moved to Alabama for a fresh start.

Cast
 Duane "Dog" Chapman
 Beth Chapman
 Leland Chapman
 Cecily Chapman 
 Dakota Chapman (Season 1-2)

Episodes

Season 1 (2013)

Season 2 (2014)

Season 3 (2015)

References

External links

 

2010s American reality television series
2013 American television series debuts
English-language television shows
CMT (American TV channel) original programming
2015 American television series endings
American television spin-offs
Reality television spin-offs